This is a list of recordings released by the TV series Sesame Street. Many of the early Columbia and CTW (Children's Television Workshop) releases have been re-released on the Sony Wonder label, and later by The Orchard and Warner Music Group.

1970s
1970 - The Sesame Street Book & Record: Original Cast (a.k.a. Sesame Street 1) (Columbia CS 1069) / 1974 (CTW 22064) (US #23, 54 weeks)
1970 - The Sesame Street Carry About Box Set (Columbia) / (CRA) 
1970 - Susan Sings Songs From Sesame Street (Scepter SPS-584) (US #86, 13 weeks)
1970 - Bob McGrath from Sesame Street (Affinity 1001) (US #126, 11 weeks)
1971 - Sesame Street 2 - Original Cast (Warner Bros. BS 2569) / 1975 (CTW 22074) (US #78, 10 weeks)
1971 - The Muppet Alphabet Album (Columbia CC 25503) / 1996 - Sing The Alphabet (Sony Wonder 67747-67748) / 2008 (Koch Records)
1971 - The Muppet Alphabet Album Carry About (CRA) / 1990 - The Sesame Street Alphabet Album (Golden)
1971 - The Year of Roosevelt Franklin a.k.a. My Name is Roosevelt Franklin (Columbia C 30387) / 1974 (CTW 22067) 
1972 - Havin' Fun With Ernie and Bert (Columbia CC 25506) 
1972 - Havin' Fun With Ernie and Bert Carry About (CRA) 
1973 - Sesame Street Concert/On Stage - Live! (Columbia KC 32343) / 1975 (CTW 22075) 
1974 - Bert's Blockbusters (CTW 22051) 
1974 - Letters ...and Numbers, Too! (CTW 22055) 
1974 - Ernie's Hits (CTW 22056) 
1974 - Sing the Hit Songs of Sesame Street (CTW 22057) 
1974 - "C" Is For Cookie (CTW 22058) / 1995 - "C" is for Cookie: Cookie's Favorite Songs (Sony Wonder) 
1974 - Big Bird Sings (CTW 22059) 
1974 - Somebody Come and Play a.k.a. Play-Along Songs (CTW 22060) 
1974 - Let a Frown Be Your Umbrella (CTW 22061) 
1974 - Pete Seeger and Brother Kirk Visit Sesame Street (CTW 22062) 
1974 - Grover Sings The Blues (CTW 22066) 
1974 - Sesame Mucho! (CRA 25507) / 1979 - Welcome! (CTW 22091) 
1974 - Bob McGrath Sings For All The Boys and Girls 
1975 - Bert & Ernie Sing-Along (CTW 22068) 
1975 - The Count Counts! (CTW 22069) 
1975 - Sesame Street Monsters! (CTW 22071) / 1996 -  Monster Melodies (Sony Wonder) 
1975 - Merry Christmas from Sesame Street (CTW 25516) / 1995 - A Sesame Street Christmas (Sony Wonder) / 2008 (Koch Records)
1976 - Just Friends (CTW) 
1976 - Letters ABCD (CRA) / (CTW) 
1976 - Letters EFGH (CRA) / (CTW) 
1976 - Letters IJKL (CRA) / (CTW) 
1976 - Letters MNOP (CRA) / (CTW) 
1976 - Letters QRST (CRA) / (CTW) 
1976 - Letters UVW (CRA) / (CTW) 
1976 - Letters XYZ (CRA) / (CTW) 
1977 - Let Your Feelings Show! (CTW 22076) 
1977 - Signs! (CTW 22077) 
1977 - Happy Birthday from Sesame Street (CTW 22078) / 1992 (Golden) / 2004 (Sony Wonder)
1977 - Numbers! (CTW 22079) / 1995 (Sony Wonder) 
1977 - Letters, Numbers and Signs 3-LP Box Set (CTW 160) 
1977 - Big Bird Leads The Band (CTW 22080) 
1977 - The Sesame Street Fairy Tale Album (CTW 22081) 
1977 - Sleepytime Bird (CTW 22082) / 1990 - Sleepytime on Sesame Street (Golden)
1977 - Aren't You Glad You're You? (CTW 22083) 
1977 - Bob Sings! (CTW 22084) 
1977 - What Time Is It On Sesame Street? (CTW 25517) 
1977 - Sesame Street Gold! (CTW 79001) 
1978 - Sesame Street Story Time (CTW 22086) 
1978 - On The Street Where We Live - Block Party! (CTW 22087) 
1978 - David: Daydreamin' On A Rainy Day (CTW 25518) 
1978 - Fair Is Fair (CTW 22088) 
1978 - Sing, Sang Song Singalong (CTW 25520) 
1978 - Sesame Street Silver - 10th Anniversary Album (CTW 79002) 
1978 - Sesame Street Fever soundtrack (CTW) 
1979 - At Home With Ernie and Bert (CTW) 
1979 - Every Body's Record (CTW) 
1979 - Anne Murray Sings for the Sesame Street Generation (CTW) 
1979 - The Stars Come Out On Sesame Street (CTW) 
1979 - Sesame Disco (CTW) 
1979 - Dinah! Pays a Visit to Sesame Street—I've Got A Song (CTW)

1980s
1980 - In Harmony: A Sesame Street Record (Warner Bros) (US #156)
1980 - The People in Your Neighborhood (CTW) 
1980 - Big Bird's Birdtime Stories (CTW) 
1980 - Christmas Eve on Sesame Street (CTW)
1980 - Love (CTW) 
1980 - Sesame Street Treasury (Columbia House)
1981 - Bert & Ernie Side By Side (Golden) 
1981 - Camping in Canada
1981 - Getting Ready For School (CTW) 
1981 - Sesame Country (CTW) 
1981 - Big Bird Discovers the Orchestra (CTW)
1981 - Grin and Giggle With Big Bird (CTW)
1981 - Sesame Count (CTW) / 1992 (Golden)
1982 - Big Bird Presents Hans Christian Andersen1982 - For The First Time1982 - Exercise! (CTW) 
1982 - Just Friends1982 - Just the Two of Us1982 - Sesame Street Sing-Along! (CTW) / 1993 - A Sesame Street Sing-Along (Golden)
1983 - Surprise!1983 - The Gang's All Here 
1983 - Born To Add: Great Rock & Roll (CTW) / 1993 (Golden) / 1995 (Sony Wonder) 
1983 - The Best of Big Bird (Golden) 
1983 - The Best of Ernie (Golden) 
1983 - The Best of Bert (Golden) 
1983 - The Best of Grover (Golden) 
1983 - The Best of Cookie Monster (Golden) 
1983 - The Best of Oscar The Grouch (Golden) 
1983 - The Best of The Count (Golden) 
1984 - Sesame Street Christmas Sing-Along (CTW) / 1993 - Merry Christmas: A Sesame Street Sing-Along (Golden)
1985 -  Sesame Street Presents Follow That Bird Soundtrack (RCA)
1986 - Bounce Along with Big Bird (Golden) / 1996 (Sony) 
1986 - Christmas on Sesame Street (CBS)
1987 - The Best of Sesame Street (Sight & Sound)

1990s
1990 - Put Down the Duckie! (Golden)
1991 - Bob's Favorite Street Songs (A&M)
1991 - Jim Henson: A Sesame Street Celebration (Golden) 
1992 - Sing: Songs of Joe Raposo (Golden) 
1993 - Sesame Road (Golden) / 1995 (Sony Wonder) 
1993 - We Are All Earthlings (Golden) 
1994 - Sesame Street Celebrates! (Golden) 
1994 - Cheep Thrills (Golden)
1995 - Sesame Street Platinum: All-Time Favorites (Sony Wonder) / 2008 (Koch Records)
1995 - The Bird is the Word! Big Bird's Favorite Songs (Sony Wonder) 

1995 - Splish Splash: Bath Time Fun (Sony Wonder) 
1996 - Bert and Ernie's Greatest Hits (Sony Wonder) 
1996 - Big Bird's Band Plays Together (Sony Wonder) 
1996 - Rosita's Block Party (Sony Wonder) 
1996 - Sing-Along Travel Songs (Sony Wonder) 
1996 - Silly Songs (Sony Wonder) / 2009 (Koch Records)
1996 - Dreamytime Songs (Sony Wonder) 
1997 - Hot! Hot! Hot! Dance Songs (Sony Wonder) / 2008 (Koch Records)
1997 - Sesame Street Platinum Too (Sony Wonder) 
1997 - The Count's Countdown (Sony Wonder) 
1997 - Oscar's Trashy Songs (Sony Wonder) 
1997 - The Best Of Elmo (Sony Wonder) / 2008 (Koch Records)
1997 - Elmo's Favorite Sing-Alongs (Sony Wonder) 
1997 - Kids' Favorite Songs (Sony Wonder) / 2008 (Koch Records)
1998 - Fiesta Songs! (Sony Wonder) 
1998 - Elmopalooza! (Sony Wonder) / 2008 (Koch Records)
1998 - Elmo's Lowdown Hoedown (Sony Wonder) 
1998 - Elmo Says BOO! (Sony Wonder) 
1998 - Elmo Saves Christmas (Sony Wonder) / 2008 (Koch Records)
1999 - The Adventures of Elmo in Grouchland (Sony Wonder)

2000s
2000 - CinderElmo (Sony Wonder) 
2001 - Elmo & the Orchestra (Sony Wonder) 
2001 - Kids' Favorite Songs 2 (Sony Wonder)
2003 - Songs from the Street: 35 Years of Music (Sony Wonder)

2010s
2010 - Sesame Street Old School Volume 1 (Koch Records)
2010 - Sesame Street Old School Volume 2 (Koch Records)
2011 - Sesame Street Music: Amazon Sampler (Amazon.com/Sesame Workshop)
2011 - Sesame Street Christmas Collection (Sesame Workshop)
2012 - Sesame Street Valentine's Collection (Sesame Workshop)
2012 - A Special Sesame Street Christmas: Soundtrack from the Emmy Nmminated Special (Legend Group Records)
2012 - Elmo's Dance Party (Sesame Workshop)
2012 - Sunny Days Collection (Sesame Workshop)
2012 - Travel Songs (Sesame Workshop)
2012 - Summer Games Collection (Sesame Workshop)
2012 - Back to School Collection2012 - Halloween Collection2012 - Giving Thanks Collection2013 - Holiday Classics2014 - V is for Valentine2014 - Lyrical Letters2015 - Keep Christmas with You (Mormon Tabernacle Choir)

Unreleased 1974 Sesame Street record albums
 Bob and Susan Sing Songs from Sesame Street Tu Me Gustas (I Like You) Sesame Street Zoo''

See also
The Muppets discography

References

External links
Muppet Wiki: Sesame Street Discography

 
Discographies of American artists
Film and television discographies
Columbia Records soundtracks
Warner Records soundtracks